Duleri Dogon or Duleri Dom, also known as Tiranige dige, is a Dogon language spoken in Mali.

References

Sources
 .
 

Dogon languages
Languages of Mali